, Thomas Cook Airlines Belgium flew to 36 destinations throughout Africa and Europe. This list does not contain destinations operated by sister companies Thomas Cook Airlines, Thomas Cook Airlines Scandinavia or Condor. Thomas Cook Airlines Belgium ceased all operations on 27 October 2017.

List

References 

Lists of airline destinations